"Sex Me" is the first solo single released by American R&B singer R. Kelly, released as the first single from his solo debut album, 12 Play. The single became Kelly's first solo success, reaching number two on the R&B chart and reaching number twenty on the top 40 of the Billboard Hot 100. The single was also certified Gold in the US.

Music video
The accompanying music video for part 1 and 2 was directed by Kim Watson.

Uses in popular culture
The song is used as the lyrics for Chris Brown's 2014 song "Songs on 12 Play" from his album X.

Charts

Weekly charts

Year-end charts

References

1993 singles
R. Kelly songs
Songs written by R. Kelly
Song recordings produced by R. Kelly
Contemporary R&B ballads
1993 songs
Jive Records singles
1990s ballads